George Cobb may refer to:
George T. Cobb (1813–1870), U.S. Representative from New Jersey
George H. Cobb (1864–1943), acting Lieutenant Governor of New York in 1910
George L. Cobb (1886–1942), ragtime composer
George Cobb (lighthouse keeper), American lighthouse keeper
George Cobb (baseball) (1865–1926), American Major League Baseball player
George Cobb (golf) (1914–1986), American golf course designer
George Cobb (coach) (1885–1957), head coach of the Rhode Island Rams football team, 1909–1911, and 1913–1914
Sir George Cobb, 3rd Baronet, of the Cobb baronets

See also
Cobb (surname)